The men's marathon at the 1969 European Athletics Championships was held in Athens, Greece, on 21 September 1969.

Medalists

Results

Final
21 September

Participation
According to an unofficial count, 32 athletes from 18 countries participated in the event.

 (2)
 (2)
 (1)
 (1)
 (3)
 (1)
 (3)
 (2)
 (1)
 (1)
 (1)
 (2)
 (1)
 (3)
 (1)
 (3)
 (3)
 (1)

References

Marathon
Marathons at the European Athletics Championships
Euro
1969 European Athletics
Men's marathons